Luc Colijn (born 2 May 1958) is a Belgian former professional racing cyclist. He rode in the 1981 Tour de France. He is the grandson of cyclist Achiel Buysse.

Major results

Road

1978
 1st  Road race, National Military Road Championships
 2nd  Military Road World Championships
 3rd Brussel–Opwijk
1979
 1st Ronde van Vlaanderen Beloften
 5th Kattekoers
1980
 1st Stage 1 Tour de Wallonie
 1st Coupe Egide Schoeters
 2nd Kampioenschap van Vlaanderen
 3rd Grand Prix de Waregem
1981
 1st Petegem-aan-de-Leie
 2nd Leeuwse Pijl
 3rd Paris–Tours
 3rd Nationale Sluitingprijs
 8th De Brabantse Pijl
 8th Grote Prijs Jef Scherens
1982
 1st Nationale Sluitingprijs
 1st Berlare
 1st De Pinte
 1st GP Lanssens 
 2nd Omloop van het Zuidwesten
 3rd Flèche Hesbignonne
 8th Kuurne–Brussels–Kuurne
1983
 1st Omloop van de Grensstreek
 1st Prix de Mellet
 2nd Le Samyn
 2nd Grand Prix de Peymeinade
 3rd Omloop Het Volk
 3rd Rund um den Henninger Turm
 4th Tour of Flanders
 6th Grand Prix de Wallonie
 7th Amstel Gold Race
 9th De Brabantse Pijl
 9th E3 Prijs Vlaanderen
 10th Paris–Tours
1984
 1st GP Stad Zottegem
 1st Ronde van Midden-Zeeland
 6th Omloop Het Volk
 8th Tour of Flanders
 8th E3 Prijs Vlaanderen
 10th De Kustpijl
1985
 4th Dwars door België
 6th Omloop Het Volk
1986
 1st Nokere Koerse
1987
 1st Zomergem-Adinkerke
 5th Grand Prix Cerami
 8th De Kustpijl
1989
 1st Dwars door West-Vlaanderen
1990
 6th Nokere Koerse
1991
 1st Gullegem Koerse
 6th Overall Tour d'Armorique
1992
 5th Tour de Vendée

Track

1978
Belgian National Championships
1st  Amateur Pursuit (with François Caethoven, Hendrik Caethoven and Patrick Lerno)
1979
Belgian National Championships
1st  Amateur Points
1st  Amateur Derny
1989
European Track Championships
 1st  Derny
1991
European Track Championships
 3rd  Derny

Grand Tour general classification results timeline
Source:

References

External links
 

1958 births
Living people
Belgian male cyclists
Place of birth missing (living people)